The Extraordinary and Plenipotentiary Ambassador of Peru to the Republic of Colombia is the official representative of the Republic of Peru to the Republic of Colombia.

Both countries established relations on June 6, 1822. Relations were initially amicable, although a territorial dispute soon led to conflict between both states. The first such conflict was the Gran Colombia–Peru War, being followed by skirmishes that would last almost a century after, culminating in the 20th century Battle of La Pedrera and the Colombia–Peru War, ultimately being resolved by the Salomón–Lozano Treaty and the 1934 Rio Protocol.

Today, relations remain amicable, and both countries cooperate in several international organizations.

List of representatives

Gran Colombia (1822–1831)
Peru first sent representatives to Gran Colombia, including short-lived Guayaquil.

New Granada (1831–1863)
After the dissolution of Gran Colombia, Peru continued its relations with New Granada (as well as Venezuela and Ecuador), which was itself succeeded by the Granadine Confederation in 1858.

Colombia (1863–present)

The United States of Colombia succeeded New Granada in 1863, and eventually became the Republic of Colombia in 1886.

See also
List of ambassadors of Peru to Ecuador
List of ambassadors of Peru to Venezuela

References

Colombia
Peru